The Marvel Mangaverse is a series of comic books published by Marvel Comics from 2000 to 2002, with a sequel "New Mangaverse" released in 2006.

The series depicts an alternate (or possibly two alternates, see below) Marvel universe, where its characters are drawn and portrayed in a manga-like style. Four volumes were published for the series, two of which were connected by a continuing story arc with multiple Marvel characters, while the third and fourth series each started a new story and focused on a single character, which were Spider-Man Mangaverse and Jean Grey of an alternate version (apparently) of Spiderverse.

Official Handbook of the Marvel Universe: Alternate Universes 2005 has given the numerical designation of "Marvel Mangaverse" as Earth-2301. The majority of the artwork in the first volume was shared between different artists, each of whom delivered one issue, with book-ends by Ben Dunn, whose work is best known on the comic series Ninja High School. Dunn also did the entirety of the artwork for volume 2 of Mangaverse. The artwork for the five issue miniseries New Mangaverse: The Rings of Fate was done by Tom Hanks.

Volume 1

Plot: Three years prior to the story Dr. Banner discovered the Negative Zone, a dimension which contains vast amounts of energy, and was tricked by the terrorist organization HYDRA into building "the Energy Well", a means of harvesting this energy, to power their weapon of mass destruction. However, when the weapon was fired it created a massive EMP which caused a global blackout for twenty-four hours, killing thousands. During this time of crisis, Prince Namor of Atlantis led an invasion of the surface but was stopped by Iron Man, who disappeared soon after. Tony Stark rescued the now insane Dr. Banner and suppressed any memory of his involvement from his mind with a Cerebral Driver. Various forces conspire to create a second Energy Well, which leads to the emergence of Dormammu into Earth's dimension, who is defeated by the combined power of Thor and the willpower and strength of the heroes assembled to battle him. Serving Dormammu is a massive, Godzilla-esque incarnation of the Hulk- separate from Banner, who is destroyed by Thor quickly after Thor incarnates using Banner as a focus.

Tony Stark reappears during the first volume, reduced to a head, in an advisory role to the Mangaverse incarnation of the Avengers. Iron Man also appears in the form of a number of large robots that resemble famous Super Robot anime mechas. These machines combine into a still larger mecha, which he calls Ultimate Ironman. This Mecha would reappear in Volume 2, destroyed in combat with T'Channa, sister of the Black Panther and the second Mangaverse character to be known as Dr. Doom.

Characters
Iron Maiden - (Antoinette "Toni" Stark) A former S.H.I.E.L.D. agent, the sister of Tony Stark, and current owner of Stark Industries. Unlike her brother, Toni has made her identity public and opened defense contracts with the U.S. military. She is referred to as "ironbitch" by the Wasp in the first issue of the series when she is nearly clipped by Stark as she returns from an unrevealed location/mission (this was changed when the book was printed for children to "ironpest"). Revealed in the final issue of the first volume to share a loving bond with Bruce Banner. Ascends to another plane of existence at the conclusion with Bruce. She also appears with a large mecha attachment to her suit which design is attributed to the RX-78GP03 Gundam Dendrobium from the anime Mobile Suit Gundam 0083: Stardust Memory.

Bruce Banner - Currently reconstructing "the Energy Well" for Stark Industries. Gained the ability to summon gods after being exposed to gamma radiation when the well malfunctioned. Has a love for Toni Stark, which she returns. Ascends to another plane of existence at the conclusion alongside her.

Wasp - Janet Van Dyne is an employee of Stark Industries and the creator of W.A.S.P. (Winged Amplification Surge Plasma) which allows her to fly. Differs from the original Wasp whose powers came from experimentation by Hank Pym, and also could change size via a serum.

Hank Pym - A boy genius/rock star, called to Stark Island to help Banner construct "the Energy Well". Can control ants with his guitar like Ant-Man did with his helmet, but like the Wasp is unable to change size.

Black Panther/Falcon - T'Challa came to Stark Island as a representative of the African nation of Wakanda, and uses mystic arts to become the half human/half panther hero. He can also change his totemic power and become this reality's Falcon. The Mangaverse version of Tigra found herself romantically attracted to him. In New Mangaverse: The Rings of Fate Panther is implied to have been killed by the villains in the story.

Storm - Ororo Munroe was a member of a witch coven where she learned how to summon the elements of weather and now leads the X-Men. Villainous mutant Amanda Sefton was a friend of Ororo but tried to bring back the evil spirit Magnus. In X-Men: Ronin she is neither the group's leader nor a witch, but is once again a mutant and, as in the mainstream series, forms a very brief relationship with Forge, who dies at the hands of Jean Grey. In New Mangaverse: The Rings of Fate Storm and all other mutants except Wolverine are said to be neutralized, which implies that they, like most of the other Mangaverse heroes, were killed.

Doctor Strange - The Mangaverse Doctor Strange is much younger than his mainstream counterpart, appearing to be roughly in his 20s. It is hinted at that he is trained as a medical doctor like the Earth-616 Stephen Strange. He is the Master of the Mystic Arts, has a rivalry with Baron Mordo, continually researches new spells, and watches over the world. His assistant is Tigra. He is vaporized in the first pages of issue one of New Mangaverse: The Rings of Fate.

Tigra - Tigra works as Doctor Strange's assistant and "sidekick". In this incarnation, she was cursed into her were-tiger form, and must accomplish 1000 good deeds for the curse to be broken. She had romantic feelings towards the Mangaverse Black Panther in volumes one and two of Mangaverse. In New Mangaverse: The Rings of Fate she is encased in ice and dismembered. Up until this point, Tigra and Dr. Strange were the only two characters outside of the X-Men, the Scarlet Witch, and Spider-Man to have survived through the entirety of the Mangaverse series.

The Incredible Hulk - not, as in other incarnations, an alternate form of Bruce Banner, the Mangaverse Hulk is merely summoned into existence by Banner.

Daimon Hellstrom and Johnny Blaze - The Ghost Riders, Sons of Satan. Two brothers that become monster-hunters and battle their evil sister Satana.

Omar Medina - Omar was a creation by Dr. Doom whose primary purpose was to assassinate and take the body of Doctor Strange back to the Alpha Labs where Dr. Doom could finally claim him.

Volume 2

The second Mangaverse graphic novel continued storylines produced in the original series which was later collected as the first graphic novel. This series, at the start, brought back the Mangaverse version of the Fantastic Four, although slightly modified in appearance from the initial look they had in the mid-part of the first volume (though in the final issue they look as they do in volume 2). The story also introduced Mangaverse versions of Galactus (as a parasitic life form created by the Skrulls), The Watcher (who appears to be closest in characterization to his respective counterpart than any other Mangaverse character), a 13-year-old Captain Marvel, gigantic versions of four heralds of Galactus, and the Inhumans. An armored individual resembling Doctor Doom made a cameo in these first few issues, who then became the primary villain for the remainder of the series. Revealed to be the sister of Black Panther, this version of Doom decimates the Avengers, and it is only through the combined efforts of the Fantastic Four, Doctor Strange, Tigra, and the Scarlet Witch (the lone surviving member of the Mangaverse Avengers) that the heroes are able to defeat this version of Doom and restore some resemblance of order after the mayhem caused by Doom.

Volume 2 is notable for borrowing plot elements and style from the anime Neon Genesis Evangelion.

Spider-Man Mangaverse

X-Men Mangaverse

The X-Men first appeared in the first series of one-shots which were later compiled into volume one of Marvel Mangaverse. Wolverine, Cyclops, Storm, Mirage and Jean Grey form the core of this group. Rogue doesn't appear to be an actual member of the group, though she does live with them. In this version of the X-Men, it is Wolverine, not Xavier, who has put the team together. He has one set of metal claws, most likely adamantium, on his right hand, and another set on his left composed of energy. He has white hair and a strange tattoo on his face, possibly meant to be the Greek symbol Omega. In this story, Wolverine and Cyclops are brothers. Wolverine cost Cyclops one of his eyes, while it is hinted that Cyclops cost Wolverine one of his hands. (This seems to be why one of Wolverine's sets of claws is energy while the other is metal. Throughout this story with the exception of a pair of panels, Wolverine was depicted with two flesh and blood hands, the flesh and blood appearance of both hands continued in the final issue of the first arc of Mangaverse). He is also hinted to have had a relationship with Jean Grey, who had begun to favor Cyclops. Several other characters (both good and evil in the mainstream universe) appear in this story, most of whom are forces for evil, including The Beast, Amanda Sefton, Mystique and Nightcrawler.

X-Men: Ronin

This storyline centered around The X-Men and the Hellfire Club, who were battling on-and-off during the entirety of the story arc, due to the Hellfire Club's continued attempts to abduct Jean Grey and bring her into their group. During this storyline, Storm, who is not a witch in this storyline, but simply a mutant with power over the weather like the mainstream Marvel Universe, develops an attraction to Forge. The Phoenix Force, which was briefly glimpsed when Rogue tapped into it in the first volume of Mangaverse, has a much more important role here as Jean begins to either develop the Phoenix powers, or else is possessed by them. The X-Men's physical appearances are the same except Wolverine now has black hair, no tattoo on his face, and a mechanical right hand with energy claws (rather than the energy claws being on his left hand as in the first volume). Although not implicitly stated, it seems that the concept of Logan and Scott as brothers who each cost the other a part of his body connected to his offensive capabilities remains. Charles Xavier is depicted as the leader of the Hellfire Club, putting him into direct opposition to the X-Men. He has two daughters, Sage and Emma Frost. The Sentinels are Mecha, piloted by humans, (one of whom is Forge), who are killed in battle with both the X-Men and Hellfire Club, and are more or less obliterated by Jean Grey's newly developing Phoenix powers. The X-Men are advised by Toad, who is a very wise and Yoda-like person. As a former close friend of Xavier, Toad is determined to destroy the Hellfire Club and bring Charles back to the X-Men.

The Punisher Mangaverse

In this self-contained storyline (written by Peter David and pencilled and inked by Lea Hernandez), The Punisher is a woman named Sosumi Brown who is the principal of an unnamed private school. In the story (set in Tokyo), the Punisher fights against the Korean Skang Kee crime family, led by Skang Kee Ho. The Skang Kee family uses an Oni (Japanese demon) named Oni Yew to try and stop her, but her sister (Hashi Brown) finds out about her secret, and in the process obtains a cursed weapon which she uses to slay the Oni and save her sister. (In the story, it is explained they are orphans due to the death of their parents in "a tragic pogo stick accident".)

Unlike Frank Castle, Mangaverse Punisher does not use firearms, but martial art skills and a whip, which she uses to punish evildoers into submission. She also has a predisposition for bizarre forms of "punishment", including tickling a crime lord's feet with feathers, or spanking someone on the bottom. Because of this, she is referred to as "Tokyo's kinkiest superhero". Also, she uses a costume which makes her resemble a geisha, and wears facial makeup which gives the illusion of her face being a skull. Her base of operations is located within the school where she works; the entrance opens by moving a small skull inside her office.

The Punisher of Marvel Mangaverse was part of the stories collected into volume 1 of the Marvel Mangaverse graphic novels, and has not been seen since the first run of stories.

New Mangaverse: The Rings of Fate

New Mangaverse: The Rings of Fate is the third sequel series to volumes one and two of Marvel Mangaverse, and starts some time after the events of  Volume Two, Legend of the Spider-Clan  and X-Men: Ronin. Direct references are made to both Legend of the Spider-Clan and Mangaverse Volume Two.

The Hand  make their first appearance in the Mangaverse. They are responsible for the deaths of roughly 99% of the superhuman population in the Mangaverse. They are also armed with the rings of Iron Man's long time nemesis The Mandarin. Elektra and Daredevil also make appearances; Elektra kills Daredevil and is herself cleaved in half by Carol Danvers in combat near the end of the series. Danvers then takes possession of a costume and shield which once belonged to Captain America, nearly identical to his costume from the mainstream universe (altered for a female body, making Danvers look similar to Shannon Carter, the MC2 heroine known as The American Dream). The shield, however, is identical entirely to the 616 version in appearance (though whether or not it is made of the same composition, is completely unknown).

Tony Stark returns, and once again becomes Iron Man. Together, the remaining heroes; Spider-Man, Spider-Woman, Black Cat, Wolverine, Iron Man, the Human Torch, and the new Captain America form a new group of Avengers and battle and defeat the Hand, along with a mind controlled Sharon Carter.

Several characters introduced in the previous volumes of the series were redesigned in appearance and/or personality for New Mangaverse. The Black Cat, who was introduced in Legend of the Spider-Clan, bears a striking facial resemblance to Rei Ayanami, a character from Evangelion in New Mangaverse. Spider-Man, briefly unmasked near the end of the series, bears a resemblance to Shinji Ikari. Wolverine is redesigned in New Mangaverse as well, becoming taller, wearing gear resembling the armor worn by Vegeta of Dragon Ball, with a more muscular build, a facial structure intended to be based on that of Vegeta, and a redesign of his bionic hand and energy claws. The Human Torch, whose personality, rather than looks, have been based on that of Asuka Soryu of Evangelion since volume one of the series, underwent a radical change. Her hairstyle and facial structure as well as physique are altered. Her hair is now done in pigtails, somewhat more closely resembling the hairstyle of Asuka, rather than a combination of straight hair with ringlets. Her half sister Sioux Storm, originally patterned after Rei Ayanami in physical appearance (despite her hair being blonde rather than blue) as well as personality, changed in personality between volumes 1 and 2 of the Mangaverse collections, and by the time of New Mangaverse was much more emotional and sported longer hair, no longer bearing any resemblance whatsoever to Rei, and was slain shortly after her appearance in the second issue of New Mangaverse.

At the end of the series, the Black Cat is revealed to have been working alongside Nick Fury, who is implied to have orchestrated the decimation of the super-powered population. Whether or not she is truly loyal to Fury, if indeed this is actually Fury, who is himself believed to be dead, has yet to be revealed.

New Mangaverse, though left open ended, appears to have been intended as the finale for the Marvel Mangaverse, as the near entirety of its superhuman population was decimated. It is therefore likely that the Black Cat's genuine loyalties will remain unknown due to New Mangaverse being the swan song for this particular universe.

In the Hulk: Broken Worlds anthology there's a short story, telling one of mangaverse's Hulk adventures in Norse Cosmological Zone, which happens before the first volume.

The Scarlet Witch did not appear in the New Mangaverse storyline (perhaps slain as were 99% of the world's other heroes). Tigra and Doctor Strange appeared in the first few pages of the New Mangaverse comic to be brutally murdered by the Hand ninja.

See also
 Marvel Anime
 Marvel Comics multiverse
 Spider-Man: The Manga
 X-Men: The Manga
 Hulk: The Manga
 Del Rey Manga/Marvel
 Marvel × Shōnen Jump+ Super Collaboration

References

External links
Marvel pages: MM2002, MMAA2002, MMET, MMFF2002, MMGR2002, MMND2002, MMP2002, MMS-M2002, MMX-M2002, NM2006
New Mangaverse Reviews at Spiderfan.org

Marvel Comics imprints
Magnaverse, Marvel
Marvel Comics titles
Marvel Entertainment franchises
Original English-language manga